Rukatunturi is a  high fell and a ski resort in Kuusamo, Finland. Apart from downhill skiing, there are over 500 km of cross-country skiing tracks. Also snowmobiles can be rented to enjoy some of the area's 600 km of snowmobile routes (of which 100 km are safari organizers' private routes). Ruka is also the southern end of the Karhunkierros hiking trail. The total of trails in Ruka and Kuusamo area is: 160 km of hiking trails, 605 km of biking routes, 350 km of classified paddling routes (including class 1–4 whitewater paddling) and 100 km of boating routes.

In winter 1954, the first slope, now called "Eturinne" ("Front Slope"), was opened. The current number of slopes is 29, operated with 20 ski lifts (one high-speed detachable chair with bubble). There's effective snowmaking on all runs by almost 90 snowguns and 5 groomers.

Ruka has turned into a diverse tourist centre whose year-round usage is growing. In winter there are for example Nordic skiing World Cup competitions. FIS Nordic Combined season starts yearly in Ruka (Nordic Opening). There are also annual national competitions in alpine and freestyle skiing, and there have been international competitions in these sports, too.

Ruka has one of the longest ski seasons in Europe, starting usually in October and ending in June. During the main season ski lifts are open daily from 9.30 am until 7 pm. There's also night skiing on Fridays 7–11 pm (usually from December until mid-April).

Ruka Through The Seasons 

In the winter months Ruka is a ski resort and activity centre with 29 ski slopes, 23 flood lit slopes for night skiing, over 500 km of cross country ski tracks, a border cross park and street as well as other activities such as snowmobiling, snowshoeing, reindeer sleigh rides, husky sled rides, visits to Santa's home, ice carting, ice fishing, ice climbing and Finnish sauna.  The winter season usually runs from the beginning of December until May.

In the summer the snow melts and Ruka becomes a hiking and mountain biking centre with the Oulanka National Park and world-famous Karhunkierros, 80 km hiking trail, on its doorstep.  Other activities on offer are canoeing, white water rafting, fishing, birdwatching, hiking with huskies, lake cruises, bear watching, water skiing and ATV safaris.

In the autumn the forests of Ruka and Kuusamo change colours, with not just the trees but the forest floor, which is carpeted in plants, turning reds, oranges and yellows.

Ruka Pedestrian Village 
In November 2010 the Ruka Pedestrian Village became ready. Ruka now has an underground car park for 320 vehicles. The car park is heated in winters. Now it is possible to walk from the hotels to the slopes without crossing any roads.

See also 
Levi, Finland
Rukatunturi ski jumping hill

References

External links 
 
 
 Ruka & Kuusamo travel guide www.rukakuusamo.com
 Ruka-Kuusamo homepage www.ruka.fi
 Ruka Ski Resort homepage ski.ruka.fi
 Ruka-Kuusamo homepage for Tour Operators
 Nordic Opening – FIS Nordic Combined at Ruka

Ski areas and resorts in Finland
Kuusamo
Buildings and structures in North Ostrobothnia
Tourist attractions in North Ostrobothnia